Duna World is the international television service of Duna Média, the Hungarian public broadcaster. It airs a mix of programming from Duna TV's domestic channels, together with special programmes aimed at the Hungarian diaspora in Europe, Africa, North America (especially in states near the Canada–United States border), Australia, Eurasia (Russia, Belarus, Armenia, Kazakhstan, Uzbekistan) and now in Asia Pacific.

It airs news and current affairs programming, as well as shows about Hungarian culture including drama, music, movies and more. Since September 12, 2020, its channel space became shared with M4 Sport+, a part-time service produced by sister station M4 Sport, which airs exclusively on weekends between 14:00 and 22:00. The service features broadcasts of Hungarian sports events, specially, from the Nemzeti Bajnokság I football division. It is broadcast worldwide in all Duna World feeds, regardless of the territories where it broadcasts.

External links
Duna World

Television networks in Hungary
International broadcasters
Television channels and stations established in 2006
2006 establishments in Hungary
Mass media in Budapest
MTVA (Hungary)